Grace McKenzie (8 July 1903 – August 1988) was an English swimmer from Garston, Liverpool, who competed in the 1920 Summer Olympics and 1924 Summer Olympics.

In the 1920 Olympics she won a silver medal in the 4×100 m freestyle relay event and was third in the first round of 100 m freestyle event and fourth in the first round of 300 m freestyle event and did not advance in both occasions. Four years later in Paris she won a silver medal in the 4×100 m freestyle relay event.

See also
 List of Olympic medalists in swimming (women)

References

External links
Grace McKenzie's profile at databaseOlympics

1903 births
1988 deaths
Sportspeople from Liverpool
English female swimmers
English female freestyle swimmers
Olympic swimmers of Great Britain
Swimmers at the 1920 Summer Olympics
Swimmers at the 1924 Summer Olympics
Olympic silver medallists for Great Britain
Medalists at the 1924 Summer Olympics
Medalists at the 1920 Summer Olympics
Olympic silver medalists in swimming
People from Garston
20th-century English women